{{Infobox philosopher
| region          = Western philosophy
| era             = 20th-century philosophy
| image           =מאירסון אמיל ( 1859-1933) .-PHG-1028996.png
| caption         =
| name             = Émile Meyerson
| birth_date       = 
| birth_place      = Lublin, Kingdom of Poland
| death_date       = 
| death_place      = Paris, France
| alma_mater       = University of Heidelberg
| school_tradition = French historical epistemologyEpistemological realismNeo-Kantianism<ref name="Mills">M. Anthony Mills, "Identity versus determinism: Émile Meyerson׳s neo-Kantian interpretation of the quantum theory", Studies in History and Philosophy of Science Part B: Studies in History and Philosophy of Modern Physics' 47:33–49 (2014).</ref>
| main_interests   = History and philosophy of science, epistemology, general relativity
| influences       = Auguste Comte, Immanuel Kant, Albert Einstein
| influenced       = Gaston Bachelard, Jacques Lacan, Thomas Kuhn
| notable_ideas    = Principle of lawfulness, principle of causality
}}
Émile Meyerson (12 February 1859 – 2 December 1933) was a Polish-born French epistemologist, chemist, and philosopher of science. Meyerson was born in Lublin, Poland. He died in his sleep of a heart attack at the age of 74.

Biography
Meyerson was educated at the University of Heidelberg and studied chemistry under Robert Wilhelm Bunsen. In 1882 Meyerson settled in Paris. He served as foreign editor of the Havas news agency, and later as the director of the Jewish Colonization Association for Europe and Asia Minor. He became a naturalized French citizen after World War I.

Thomas Kuhn cites Meyerson's work as influential while developing the ideas for his main work The Structure of Scientific Revolutions.

In La Déduction relativiste, Meyerson expressed the view that Einstein's general theory of relativity was a new version of the identification of matter with space, which he considered "the postulate upon which the whole (Cartesian) system rests."

 Works 
 Identité et réalité (1908)
 De l'explication dans les sciences, 2 vols. (1921)
 La déduction relativiste (1925)
 Du cheminement de la pensée, 3 vols. (1931)
 Réel et déterminisme dans la physique quantique (1933)
 Essais'' (1936)

See also
Franciszka Arnsztajnowa

Notes

External links 
Miguel Espinoza, "Meyerson, Physics and the Intelligibility of Nature"

1859 births
1933 deaths
19th-century French chemists
Epistemologists
Philosophers of science
20th-century French philosophers
Polish emigrants to France
French Zionists
19th-century Polish Jews
Jewish philosophers
French male writers